A list of the most notable films produced in Bulgaria during the 1960s ordered by year  of release. For an alphabetical list of articles on Bulgarian films see :Category:Bulgarian films.

List

References
 
 The Internet movie database

1960s
Films
Lists of 1960s films